The 1973–74 California Golden Seals season was the Seals' seventh season in the NHL.  With the continuing depletion of talent due to the World Hockey Association and a lack of interest from owner Charles O. Finley who put the team up for sale, the Seals had a miserable season and sank to a franchise low 36 points. In January 1974, the NHL bought the Seals from owner Charlie Finley for $6.585 million.  With the league takeover, the players immediately returned to wearing black skates. The Seals would conclude the season with the worst record in the league.

Offseason

Amateur Draft

Regular season

Final standings

Schedule and results

Player statistics

Skaters
Note: GP = Games played; G = Goals; A = Assists; Pts = Points; PIM = Penalties in minutes

Goaltenders
Note: GP = Games played; TOI = Time on ice (minutes); W = Wins; L = Losses; T = Ties; GA = Goals against; SO = Shutouts; GAA = Goals against average

Transactions
The Seals were involved in the following transactions during the 1973–74 season:

Trades

Additions and subtractions

References
 Golden Seals on Hockey Database
 Golden Seals on Database Hockey

California Golden Seals seasons
Cali
Cali
Calif
Calif